This is the list of stars in the constellation Phoenix.

See also
List of stars by constellation

References

List
Phoenix